The Helpmann Award for Best Visual or Physical Theatre Production is a theatre award presented by Live Performance Australia at the annual Helpmann Awards since 2001. The Helpmann Awards are Australia's national awards for live performance.

The award typically covers productions of physical theatre, circus, puppetry and other visual theatre.

Winners and nominees

Source:

See also
Helpmann Awards
 Physical theatre
 Puppetry

References

External links
The official Helpmann Awards website

B